Lauren Lazin is an American filmmaker whose documentaries have been nominated for the Emmys multiple times. She directed and produced the 2005 Oscar-nominated documentary film Tupac: Resurrection.

Career

Film work
Lazin's first feature film, Tupac: Resurrection, was nominated for a 2005 Academy Award. Her follow-up film, I'm Still Here: Real Diaries of Young People Who Lived During the Holocaust, was nominated for two 2006 Emmy Awards, and was named Best Documentary by the National Foundation for Jewish Culture. She was also the director of the documentary The Last Days of Left Eye which looked at the life and death of Lisa "Left Eye" Lopes of TLC.<ref>"Music: Retiring Was Not an Option", TIME Magazine, November 24, 2003
 "FILM; Tupac Shakur: Dead Man Talking", New York Times, November 9, 2003</ref>"Filmmaker Lauren Lazin On Her 'True Life'", by Rebecca Craven, Smith College Sophian, November 3, 2005.

Lazin was also an executive producer for The U.S. vs. John Lennon, which was distributed theatrically by Lionsgate Entertainment, and for Jihad for Love (a feature film about gay Muslims) which premiered at the 2007 Toronto Film Festival and the 2008 Berlin Film Festival. It went on to win a GLAAD award for Outstanding Documentary.

Her film Soul Train: The Hippest Trip in America was nominated for an EMMY in 2012, and was awarded the Cine Golden Eagle. It premiered as VH1's highest-rated rock documentary. Lazin's Last Days of Left Eye was the opening-night movie for the 2007 Urban World and Atlanta Film festivals. It premiered on VH1 in the spring of 2007 to critical acclaim and stellar ratings. Other recent film work for VH1 include the highly rated specials The TRL Decade and Yo! The Story of Yo! MTV Raps.

Lazin also directed the concert sequences for the film Can't Stand Losing You, a feature documentary about the rock band The Police, told from the point of view of its celebrated guitarist, Andy Summers, now in limited release in AMC theaters.

Lazin's first film, The Flapper Story (1985), premiered at the Museum of Modern Art's New Directors/New Films series and won a Student Academy Award. Her documentary Journey of Dr. Dre was nominated for two 2001 EMMY Awards.

She recently completed directing a documentary feature for Showtime, L Word Mississippi: Hate the Sin, which received critical praise and won the 2015 GLAAD award for Outstanding Documentary.

Showrunner
Lazin co-created, directed and executive produced Newlyweds: The First Year, a docu-reality series for Bravo. The high-profile series debuted May 6, 2013 to excellent ratings and reviews, and was green-lit for a second and third season.

She then went on to co-create, showrun and executive produce Bravo's Extreme Guide to Parenting, which premiered in 2014, and she is currently executive producing Neighbors With Benefits, a docudrama which premiered on A&E in 2015. Both series debuted to much buzz and press attention.

In 2012 Lazin was director and showrunner for Sperm Donor: 74 Kids and Counting, a special for The Style Network, which was nominated for a 2012 EMMY.

Development/executive producing work
Lazin has directed, produced, written and edited over forty documentaries for MTV and PBS. In 1990, she created Sex in the 90's, now a cult favorite among young audiences. In 1992, she formed the MTV News and Specials department, where she directed and executive produced the documentary series MTV Rockumentary (including bio-pics on The Who, Robbie Robertson, The B-52's, Janet Jackson and many others), MTV Cribs, Diary, My Super Sweet 16, as well as award-winning MTV News specials on topics ranging from drug abuse and racism to religious intolerance and sexual health. Lazin also executive produced the Choose or Lose election special Where Were You at 22?, which went on to be nominated for a Daytime Emmy.

She executive produced the annual Teen Nick HALO Awards (co-created and hosted by Nick Cannon). The show has featured Justin Timberlake, LeBron James, Alicia Keys, Lady Gaga, Justin Bieber, Tyra Banks, David Beckham, and Hayden Panettiere (among others) and has won several awards including Best Youth Program at the 2010 and 2011 Banff World Television Awards, and a 2012 NAACP Award.

In 2009 Lazin directed and executive produced Get Schooled: You Have The Right, which aired on over 40 television networks. The special featured LeBron James, Kelly Clarkson, and President Barack Obama. Her President Obama's Race to the Top Commencement Challenge special was produced in cooperation with the White House and received a 2012 EMMY nomination.

Lazin is also currently executive producing documentary series and specials for a variety of MTV Networks. Her series Transgeneration (a co-production of Logo and The Sundance Channel) was awarded Best Documentary at the 2006 GLAAD Awards. Her documentary series Rags to Riches profiled Snoop Dogg, Macy Gray, Akon and Nick Cannon, and was nominated for a 2007 NAMIC Award.

Other recent series of note include the hit series Dissed for MTV Mobile, Born Country for CMT, and Coming Out Stories for Logo (2007 IDA Award nominee).

Lazin has also overseen special episodes of True Life, a critically acclaimed documentary series she created about social issues affecting young people, as well as many of MTV's pro-social documentaries. She won a 2006 Environmental Media Award for her special Break the Addiction. In 1999 the network's anti-violence campaign Fight For Your Rights was awarded an EMMY.

Outside of MTV, Lazin has directed films for the National Organization for Women, induction pieces for the Rock and Roll Hall of Fame Museum (for the Supremes and the Rolling Stones), and an award-winning documentary, Seven Deadly Sins, which was featured on PBS's experimental television series, Alive From Off Center.

Branded content
Lazin directed and executive produced the high-profile series Rising Icons (for BET and Grey Goose), This Movie is Me (for MTV and various movie studios), the specials Where Does Happiness Live? (for Coca-Cola) and Imagination Unleashed: An Artisan's Journey (for Ovation and Bombay Sapphire). She recently executive produced Teenage Mutant Ninja Turtles: Behind the Action for Paramount Films and Nickelodeon.

Additional awards and honors
Lazin's films have won Ace Awards, Monitor Awards, and Cine Golden Eagles, with honors for Best Directing and Best Editing. The National Association of Minorities in Communications, The NAACP, and the National Council on Crime and Delinquency have honored her work. She also received the Ryan White Youth Service Award and the Ribbon of Hope Award for her outstanding contributions to the fight against Teen HIV/ AIDS. In 1995, Fight Back, her film about child sexual abuse, was featured in a special screening for Congress.

She is prominently featured in the reference books The Art of Documentary Film (2005), The Documentary Filmmakers Handbook (2006) and Tupac Remembered (2008), and has taught film classes at Stanford and Duke Universities. She recently was the focus of a two-day film festival retrospective at Ithaca College honoring her work.

Lazin graduated magna cum laude, Phi Beta Kappa, from Smith College in 1982 and received a master's degree in documentary film production from Stanford University in 1985. She has also received an honorary doctorate from Smith College. In 1996 the Women's College Coalition named Lazin as a “Role Model” and featured her in their national Ad Council campaign promoting women's education.

Filmography
 The Flapper Story (1985)The Flapper Story|UC Berkeley Library
 Journey of Dr. Dre (2000)
 Tupac: Resurrection (2003)
 I'm Still Here: Real Diaries of Young People Who Lived During the Holocaust (2005)
 The Last Days of Left Eye (2007)
 One Train Later (2009)
 Soul Train: The Hippest Trip in America (2010)
 Summit on the Summit (2010)
 Get Schooled: White House Race to the Top Commencement Challenge (2010)
 The 2010 TeenNick HALO Awards (2010)
 President Obama's Race to the Top Commencement Challenge (2011)
 Style Exposed: Sperm Donor - 74 Kids and More (2011)
 The 2011 TeenNick HALO Awards (2011)
 Vh1 Rock Docs: The TRL Decade (2012)
 Vh1 Rock Docs: Yo! The Story of Yo! MTV Raps (2012)
 Imagination Unleashed: An Artisan's Journey (2013)
 Newlyweds: The First Year (series) (2013)
 Extreme Guide to Parenting (series) (2014)
 L Word Mississippi: Hate the Sin (2014)
 Newlyweds The First Year: Where Are They Now? (2015)
 Neighbors With Benefits (series) (2015)

Accolades
 1985:Student Academy Award for The Flapper Story 
 2012 NAACP Image Award for Outstanding Children's Program for The 2012 Teen Nick HALO Awards 2011 BANFF World Television Festival Award for Best Youth Program – Non Fiction for The 2011 Teen Nick HALO Awards 2010 BANFF World Television Festival Award for Best Youth Program – Non Fiction for The 2010 Teen Nick HALO AwardsNominations
 2011 Daytime Emmy Award for Outstanding Special Class Special, President Obama's 2011 Race to the Top Commencement Challenge 2011 Daytime Emmy Award for Outstanding Arts & Culture Programming, Style Exposed: Sperm Donor - 74 Kids and More 2011 News & Docs Emmy Award for Outstanding Special Class Special, Soul Train: The Hippest Trip in America 2005 Academy Award for Best Documentary, Features for Tupac: Resurrection (shared nomination with Karolyn Ali)Born into Brothels Wins Documentary Feature: 2005 Oscars
 2000 Daytime Emmy Award for Outstanding Special Class Special, MTV Uncensored 2001 Daytime Emmy Award for Outstanding Special Class Special, 2000 MTV Movie Awards
 2003 IDA Award for Feature Documentaries, Tupac: Resurrection 1999 News & Documentary Emmy Award for Outstanding Coverage of a Breaking News Story – Programs, "True Life"

See also
 List of female film and television directors
 List of LGBT-related films directed by women

References

External links
 
 The Flapper Story on Internet Archive
 The Flapper Story'' on IMDb

American documentary filmmakers
American film directors
American television directors
American women documentary filmmakers
American women television directors
Smith College alumni
Stanford University alumni
Living people
Place of birth missing (living people)
Year of birth missing (living people)
21st-century American women